Gluha Bukovica is a village in the municipalities of Travnik and Kotor Varoš, Bosnia and Herzegovina.

Demographics 
According to the 2013 census, its population was 878, all of them in the Travnik part thus none in Kotor Varoš.

References

Populated places in Travnik
Populated places in Kotor Varoš